Álvaro Márcio Santos (born 30 January 1980) is a Brazilian former professional footballer who played as a forward. He is the manager of Helsingborgs IF.

Career 
Santos was born in São Paulo and began his career at Brazilian side América Mineiro from Belo Horizonte in 2000.

He moved to Swedish club Helsingborgs IF for a three years stint. He made an impact immediately upon his arrival – during his first month in Europe he was instrumental in Helsingborg's elimination of Inter Milan in the 2000–01 UEFA Champions League's third qualification round. Helsingborg qualified for the Champions League group stage, where Alvaro Santos was a key player. Three years later, his goal record in Sweden's top flight Allsvenskan drew the attention of regular Danish champions FC København. 

During his years with Helsingborg, he became a huge favourite among supporters of the club, and his impact at the club is, regarding the years since the club's top flight comeback in 1993, only rivaled by those of Henrik Larsson's and Roland Nilsson's. Many fans actually rank him higher than Henrik Larsson, and in Helsingborg, Santos is nicknamed "God".

His three years in Copenhagen were a success, scoring a total of 50 goals in 120 games for the club. At the end of the 2005–06 season, his last with the Danish champions, he finished second on the top goalscorer list with 15 goals for 33 games. Additionally, his friendly reputation earned him the nickname Verdens Flinkeste Mand (lit. "The World's Nicest Man") by the club's fans.

On 24 July 2006, Santos signed a four-year contract with FC Sochaux to take effect on 1 August. Before his contract officially began, Santos displayed his impact by scoring in a friendly match against Greek side PAOK FC on 30 July. On 2 February 2009, Santos terminated his contract with Sochaux in agreement with the French team.

On 9 February 2009, it was announced that Santos had signed a three-year contract with the Swedish club Örgryte IS. He played with his former teammate Marcus Allbäck. After the end of the 2010 Allsvenskan season he stated that he did not want to continue with Örgryte I] in Superettan. He stated that despite the relegation he felt like he was in good shape and that he wanted to return to playing in Denmark. However, he was instead loaned out to GAIS, another Gothenburg club, and later in 2011 sold to Helsingborgs IF, completing the circle, as he returned to the club where he started his European career.

In 2014, he retired from football and moved back to his native Brazil. As of 2020, Santos manages Helsingborgs IF's U19 team.

Honours 
Helsingborgs IF
 Allsvenskan: 2011
 Svenska Cupen: 2011
 Svenska Supercupen: 2011

FC Copenhagen

 Royal League: 2004–05, 2005–06

 Danish Superliga: 2003–04, 2005–06

Sochaux
 Coupe de France: 2006–07

References

Living people
1980 births
Footballers from São Paulo
Brazilian footballers
Helsingborgs IF players
F.C. Copenhagen players
FC Sochaux-Montbéliard players
RC Strasbourg Alsace players
Association football forwards
América Futebol Clube (MG) players
Örgryte IS players
GAIS players
Ligue 1 players
Danish Superliga players
Allsvenskan players
Superettan players
Brazilian expatriate footballers
Brazilian expatriate sportspeople in Denmark
Brazilian expatriate sportspeople in France
Brazilian expatriate sportspeople in Sweden
Expatriate men's footballers in Denmark
Expatriate footballers in France
Expatriate footballers in Sweden